The Women's 51 kg event at the 2010 South American Games had its semifinals held on March 25 and the final on March 27.

Medalists

Results

References
Report

51kg W